Liam O'Connor may refer to:

Liam O'Connor (cricketer) (born 1993), Australian cricketer
Liam O'Connor (Danish rapper), rapper, known as L.O.C.
Liam O'Connor (fiddler) (born 1984), Irish fiddle player
Liam O'Connor (Gaelic footballer) (1955–2013), Irish Gaelic footballer
Liam O'Connor (Irish musician), multi-instrumentalist and accordion player
Liam O'Connor (rugby union) (born 1995), Irish rugby union player

See also
Liam Connor (disambiguation)